The 1958 Omloop Het Volk was the 14th edition of the Omloop Het Volk cycle race and was held on 7 April 1958. The race started and finished in Ghent. The race was won by Jef Planckaert.

General classification

References

1958
Omloop Het Nieuwsblad
Omloop Het Nieuwsblad